Max Meyer-Olbersleben (5 April 1850 in Olbersleben – 31 December 1927 in Würzburg) was a German composer and pianist.

Biography
Meyer-Olbersleben studied with Carl Müllerhartung and Franz Liszt at the Weimar Orchestra School, and with Josef Rheinberger, Franz Wüllner, and Peter Cornelius at the Munich Conservatory. After graduation, he became Professor of piano and theory in Weimar. Later, he was Professor of counterpoint and composition at the Bavarian State Conservatory of Music in Würzburg, and became its director from 1907 to 1920. Some notable students were Adolf Sandberger, Heinrich Steinbeck, Bernard Homola and Marc Roland. In addition, he conducted the Würzburg Liedertafel from 1879 and was Court Kapellmeister of Prince-Bishop of Würzburg.

Meyer-Olberleben became known primarily as a composer of songs and choral works.

His son is the composer Ernst Ludwig Meyer-Olbersleben.

Selected works
Stage
 Clare Dettin, Opera in 3 acts, Op. 41 (1894)

Orchestral
 Feierklänge, Concert Overture, Op. 18 (1884)
 Fest-Ouverture, Op. 30 (1888)
 Sonnenhymnus, Tone Poem, Op. 90

Concertante
 Concerto in D major for viola and orchestra, Op. 112

Chamber music
 Piano Trio in E major, Op. 7 (1879)
 Sonata in C major for viola and piano, Op. 14 (1881)
 Fantasie-Sonate in A major for flute and piano, Op. 17 (1883)
 Elegische Sonate (Elegiac Sonata) for viola, cello and piano, Op. 113

Piano
 4 Mazurken (4 Mazurkas), Op. 1 (1873)
 Schneeflocken, 6 Little Pieces for piano 4-hands, Op. 4
 Reise-Erinnerungen, 9 Pieces, Op. 6 (1879)
 2 Balladen (2 Ballades), Op. 8
 Ballade in G minor, Op. 9
 Albumblätter für kleine Leute (Album Leaves from Young People), 12 Piano Pieces, Op. 11 (1881)
 2 Silhouetten (4 Silhouettes), Op. 13
 Aus launigen Stunden ..., 3 Pieces, Op. 19 (1885)
 Aus meinem Skizzenbuche ..., 3 Pieces, Op. 20
 Strombilder, 6 Pieces for piano 4-hands, Op. 21 (1885)
 Herr Frühling, Cycle of 7 piano pieces after a poem by Robert Prutz, Op. 22 (1885)
 Für Jung und Alt!, 10 Tanzweisen, Op. 24
 3 Dichtungen for piano 4-hands, Op. 25 (1886)
 Zum Gedenken, 4 Pieces, Op. 28 (1888)
 Freudvoll und leidvoll, 7 Pieces after the poem by Johann Wolfgang von Goethe, Op. 32 (1890)
 Arabesken, 5 Pieces, Op. 42 (1895)

Choral
 3 Lieder for mixed chorus, Op. 33 (1891)
 Das begrabene Lied for soprano, baritone, mixed chorus and orchestra, Op. 40 (1894)
 Der Blumen Rache for mixed chorus and orchestra, Op. 54 (1897); words by Ferdinand Freiligrath

Vocal
 4 Lieder for voice and piano, Op. 12 (1881)
 6 Lieder for voice and piano, Op. 16 (1884)
 Lied der Loreley: „Der Donner rollt um Berg und Thal“ for soprano and orchestra, Op. 26 (1887)
 4 Lieder for voice and piano, Op. 55 (1897)

References

External links
 
 

1850 births
1927 deaths
German composers
German classical pianists
Male classical pianists
19th-century classical pianists
19th-century German musicians
19th-century male musicians